The Garment District, also known as the Garment Center, the Fashion District, or the Fashion Center, is a neighborhood located in the borough of Manhattan in New York City. The dense concentration of fashion-related uses give the neighborhood its name.

The neighborhood is home to many of New York City's showrooms and to numerous major fashion labels, and caters to all aspects of the fashion process from design and production to wholesale selling. The Garment District has been known since the early 20th century as the center for fashion manufacturing and fashion design in the United States, and even the world.

Geography
By the late 1930s, the Garment District was broadly surrounded by Sixth Avenue to the east, 25th Street to the south, Ninth Avenue to the west, and 42nd Street to the north. The southern portion, between 25th and 30th Streets, comprised the Fur District, which conducted a very similar function.

The modern-day Garment District's boundaries may be defined most broadly as the area of Manhattan west of Fifth Avenue, below 42nd Street, and as far south as the mid- or upper-20s (including the Fashion Institute of Technology between 26th and 28th Streets from Seventh to Eighth Avenues). The Midtown apparel industry was traditionally concentrated between 28th Street and 38th Street, historically centered around Seventh Avenue (designated "Fashion Avenue" in 1972 for the portion between 26th St. and 42nd St.). With the decline of the industry, the district began to shrink and be concentrated most heavily in the area between Fifth and Ninth Avenues and 35th and 41st Streets, as of 2004. In areas historically part of the Garment District, real estate developers have marketed their projects as being located in Chelsea.

Role in fashion
With $9 billion in annual sales in 2011, New York City is the United States' top "global fashion city." The core of the industry is Manhattan's Garment District, where the majority of the city's major fashion labels operate showrooms and execute the fashion process from design and production to wholesaling. No other city has a comparable concentration of fashion businesses and talent in a single district.

The Garment District is home to a number of well-known designers, their production facilities, warehouses, showrooms, and suppliers of fabric and materials. Many in the industry allege that this dense concentration of talent, entrepreneurship and supply stores functions like an ecosystem in which each of the parts help sustain the whole. Major fashion labels such as Carolina Herrera, Oscar de la Renta, Calvin Klein, Donna Karan, Liz Claiborne, Nicole Miller, Ben-Amun, and Andrew Marc have showrooms, production facilities, or support offices located in the Garment District.

While historically known as the center of textile manufacturing, global trends have changed the way the fashion industry in the Garment District functions. Over the last 50 years, New York’s garment manufacturing sector has experienced a steady decline within the City overall and within the Fashion District specifically. This has occurred as a result of high Manhattan rents, domestic manufacturers becoming less competitive in the global marketplace, in addition to the outsourcing of clothes manufacturing to lower-cost foreign markets.

The decline of the manufacturing sector caused manufacturing in the Garment District to go down as well, and in 1987, the New York City government created the Special Garment Center District zoning (SGCD) to help preserve garment manufacturing. The zoning places manufacturing use restrictions on large portions of the district in an effort to keep manufacturing rents affordable.  However, the City’s use of zoning as a job retention tool did not achieve its goal, and manufacturing has continued to decline at the same pace after the zoning was enacted as it did before the preservation measures were in place. This issue has been visited and revisited by policy makers, fashion industry representatives, manufacturing and union representatives and owners of property in the district, but the fate of the district remains uncertain.

Early history

New York first assumed its role as the center of the nation's garment industry by producing clothes for slaves working on Southern plantations. It was more efficient for their masters to buy clothes from producers in New York than to have the slaves spend time and labor making the clothing themselves. In addition to supplying clothing for slaves, tailors produced other ready-made garments for sailors and western prospectors during slack periods in their regular business.

Prior to the mid-nineteenth century, the majority of Americans either made their own clothing, or if they were wealthy, purchased "tailor-made" customized clothing. By the 1820s, however, an increasing number of ready-made garments of a higher quality were being produced for a broader market. The production of ready-made clothing, which continued to grow, completed its transformation to an "industrialized" profession with the invention of the sewing machine in the 1850s. The need for thousands of ready-made soldiers' uniforms during the American Civil War helped the garment industry to expand further. 

Women were the main workforce before 1840. However, by 1880 men took most of the skilled positions previously held by women due to the massive migration of Jewish men from Poland and Russia. Many of them were tailors that adapted to machine production. German and Central European immigrants to America around the mid-19th century arrived on the scene with relevant business experience and skills just as garment production was passing from a proto-industrial phase to a more advanced stage of manufacture. In the early twentieth-century a largely Eastern European immigrant workforce powered the garment trades. Russian Jews recruited workers from their hometowns and broke the production into tasks able to do by less-skilled workers. Writing in 1917, Abraham Cahan credited these immigrants with the creation of American style:

Due to several nationalities, the organization of workers was hard at the beginning. Before 1880, most garment workers didn't have an interest in unions, except for cutters, which were the more skilled workers. However,  as Eastern European Jews increased in the industry, unionization increased in this group.

With an ample supply of cheap labor and a well-established distribution network, New York was prepared to meet the demand. By the end of the 1860s, Americans bought most of their clothing rather than making it themselves. During the 1870s the value of garments produced in New York increased sixfold. By 1880 New York produced more garments than its four closest urban competitors combined. Two out of five ready-to-wear garments were produced in New York City. In 1900 the value and output of the clothing trade was three times that of the city's second largest industry, sugar refining. In 1909, leading industries in New York were manufacturers of clothes for women and men, and  New York's function as America's culture and fashion center also helped the garment industry by providing constantly changing styles and new demand; in 1910, 70% of the nation's women's clothing and 40% of the men's was produced in the City.

Decline of the industry

Cheaper overseas labor and production has dramatically affected the New York industry for decades. This change has forced many designers who once manufactured their lines in the city to shift production overseas, which has in turn affected small cutting and sewing rooms as well as zipper, button, and supply stores in the Garment District. As Charles Bagli of The New York Times wrote:

Although the Garment District as well as other fashion districts have been in decline, there are many organizations working hard to keep this district vital. One such organization is the Garment District Alliance, a nonprofit business improvement district that promotes the area as a strategic business location for fashion and non-fashion-related businesses in order to bring profit into the area. For example, the Garment District Alliance organized a Fashion Walk of Fame on 7th Avenue, Arts Festivals, and a Garment District Information Kiosk located on 7th Avenue that provides sourcing information and industry-related services to fashion professionals, students, hobbyists, visitors, and shoppers.

Save the Garment Center is a campaign that was created by several members of the fashion industry in an effort to preserve the concentration of fashion industry-related uses in the district. However, as fashion manufacturing declines, many buildings that once housed these large facilities have been converted to office space. Businesses such as accountants, lawyers, public relations and many high-tech companies have moved into the area, and the area is now divided equally between fashion and non-fashion companies.

Between 1990 and 2000, the district's population grew from 2,500 to 10,281.

Transportation
The Garment District is within walking distance of Penn Station, serving the New Jersey Transit, Amtrak, and Long Island Rail Road, and Grand Central Terminal, serving the Metro-North Railroad. The New York City Subway has stations at 34th Street–Herald Square, 34th Street–Seventh Avenue, 34th Street–Eighth Avenue, Times Square–42nd Street/Port Authority Bus Terminal, and 42nd Street–Bryant Park/Fifth Avenue. The Port Authority Bus Terminal is at Eighth Avenue and 41st Street, and the PATH is nearby at 33rd Street and Sixth Avenue.

Visitor attractions
 The Fashion Walk of Fame is the only permanent landmark dedicated to American fashion
 Needle threading a buttonsculpture at the Fashion Center Business Improvement District's Information Kiosk at Seventh Avenue and 39th Street
 The Garment Workersculpture at 7th Avenue and West 39th Street by Judith Weller
 Mood Designer Fabrics is located in the Manhattan’s Garment District, a fabric store very well known on the hit television show Project Runway.
 Well known stores like Gucci, Louis Vuitton, Urban Outfitter’s and many more are also located in the district.

References

Further reading
 
 Fraser, Steven. Labor Will Rule: Sidney Hillman and the Rise of American Labor (Free Press, 1991);
 Goldstein, Gabriel, and Elizabeth Greenberg, eds. A Perfect Fit: The Garment Industry and American Jewry, 1860-1960 (2012) its origins in the nineteenth-century “rag trade” of Jewish tailors, cutters, pressers, peddlers, and shopkeepers
 Green, Nancy L. Ready-to-Wear and Ready-to-Work: A Century of Industry and Immigrants in Paris and New York (Duke University Press, 1997);
 Helfgott, Roy B. "Women's and Children's Apparel," in Max Hall, ed. Made in New York: Case Studies in Metropolitan Manufacturing, (Harvard University Press, 1959)
 Parment, Robert Parmet, The Master of Seventh Avenue: David Dubinsky and the American Labor Movement (New York University Press, 2005).
 
 
 Soyer, Daniel, ed. A Coat of Many Colors: Immigration, Globalism, and Reform in the New York City Garment Industry (Fordham University Press, 2005)
 Tyler, Gus. Look for the Union Label: A History of the International Ladies Garment Workers' Union (M. E. Sharpe, 1995)
 Waldinger, Roger D. Through the Eye of the Needle: Immigrants and Enterprise in New York's Garment Trades'' (New York University Press, 1986)

External links

 New York City Visitor Guide - Garment District
 Emporis - Garment District

Garment districts
Neighborhoods in Manhattan
Midtown Manhattan